is a 2021 Japanese fantasy drama film, written and directed by Masakazu Kaneko. Starring Sho Kasamatsu, Junko Abe, Reiko Kataoka and Ken Yasuda, the film revolves around a young manga artist who is planning to write a manga about Japanese wolves. It had its premiere at 37th Warsaw Film Festival on October 8, 2021, now it was theatrically released in Japan on 19 February 2022. The film won Golden Peacock (Best Film) at the 52nd International Film Festival of India in November 2021.

Synopsis
A young manga artist who is planning to write a manga about Japanese wolves traces the memories of the past sleeping souls in the downtown Tokyo, triggered by the encounter between an injured woman and her family.

Director Masakazu Kaneko explained, "The title of this work represents the "journey of life" that goes back and forth between reality and fantasy, experienced by a young hero who is absorbed in drawing manga."

Cast 
 Sho Kasamatsu as Sosuke
 Junko Abe as Midori / Kozue
 Ken Yasuda
 Reiko Kataoka
 Hatsunori Hasegawa
 Yōji Tanaka

Release
The film had its premiere at 37th Warsaw Film Festival in the International competition section held from  8 October to 17 October 2021. It won jury Commendation Award in the 'Ecumenical Jury' category.

The film was also invited at the 22nd Tokyo Filmex in 'Made in Japan' category, held from 30 October to 7 November 2021, and at 52nd International Film Festival of India held from November 20 to November 28, 2021. It competed for Golden Peacock awards in international competition section. It was released theatrically in Japan on 19 February 2022.

Awards and nominations

References

External links
  
 

2021 films
2021 drama films
Japanese fantasy drama films
2020s Japanese-language films
2020s fantasy drama films